Prince Esper Konstantinovich Beloselsky-Belozersky (20 October 1870 – 5 January 1921) was a prince and sailor from Russia, who represented his native country at the 1912 Summer Olympics in Nynäshamn, Sweden. Beloselsky took the bronze in the 10 Metre.

His brother  Sergei was member of the International Olympic Committee.

Biography
During the violent first mutinies by the Baltic Fleet's sailors, based in Kronstadt island naval base outside of Petrograd, Esper Konstantinovich barely avoided capture – and likely murder – by the sailors. 

Together with his two young sons, Georges and Paul Esperovich, their mother Madeleine Jakovlena (née Moulin), and nannies and household servants, he fled to Finland at first, during Revolution of the  1917. Together with the rest of the extended family at that time in Finland, they awaited developments until it was clear that there was little hope to return to Russia. They made their way to Paris  in late 1919. Meanwhile, Esper Konstantinovich's oldest son Konstantin Esperovich, a freshly promoted 18-year-old ensign of the Horse Guards, was with his detachment in Kiev. He was murdered there on 28 January 1918 by a Red Guardist sailor who shot him in the back of the head, in connection with the first revolutionary and nationalistic waves of fighting in Kiev, where Russian imperial officers were targeted by all.

See also
 Belosselsky-Belozersky family
 Krestovsky Island

References

Sources
 
 

1870 births
1921 deaths
Male sailors (sport) from the Russian Empire
Sailors at the 1912 Summer Olympics – 10 Metre
Olympic competitors for the Russian Empire
Olympic medalists in sailing
Medalists at the 1912 Summer Olympics
Emigrants from the Russian Empire to France
Russian princes
Imperial Russian Navy officers